Columbus Croxton (February 1885 – April 22, 1916) was an American Negro league pitcher in the 1900s.

A native of Mississippi, Croxton played for the Cuban Giants in 1908 and 1909. In 12 recorded games, he posted 11 hits in 36 plate appearances with a 2.79 ERA in 67.2 innings on the mound. Croxton died in Argenta, Arkansas in 1916 at age 31.

References

External links
 and Seamheads
 Lum Croxton at Arkansas Baseball Encyclopedia

1885 births
1916 deaths
Date of birth missing
Place of birth missing
Cuban Giants players
Baseball players from Mississippi
Baseball pitchers
20th-century African-American people